William Stourton may refer to:

 William Stourton (speaker), speaker of the English House of Commons, 1413
 William Stourton, 2nd Baron Stourton (c. 1430–1479), English peer
 William Stourton, 5th Baron Stourton (c. 1457–1523), English peer
 William Stourton, 7th Baron Stourton (c. 1505–1548), English peer
 William Stourton, 11th Baron Stourton (c. 1594–1672), English peer
 William Stourton, 12th Baron Stourton (died 1685), English peer
 William Stourton, 16th Baron Stourton (1704–1781), English peer
 William Stourton, 18th Baron Stourton (1776–1846), English peer
 William Stourton, 25th Baron Mowbray (1895–1965), English peer and soldier